Felix Hültel (18 May 1884 – 8 October 1961) was an Austrian footballer. He played in two matches for the Austria national football team from 1902 to 1906.

References

External links
 

1884 births
1961 deaths
Austrian footballers
Austria international footballers
Place of birth missing
Association footballers not categorized by position